Fushë Kuqe is a village and a former municipality in the Lezhë County, northwestern Albania. At the 2015 local government reform it became a subdivision of the municipality Kurbin. The population at the 2011 census was 5,460.

References

Former municipalities in Lezhë County
Administrative units of Kurbin
Villages in Lezhë County